Nazan Maksudyan (born 1977) is a historian and academic.

Works

References

Living people
Scholars of childhood
Scholars of Ottoman history
1977 births